The border between the Syrian Arab Republic and the Republic of Turkey is about  long, and runs from the Mediterranean Sea in the west to the tripoint with Iraq in the east. Much of the border follows the Southern Turkish stretch of the Baghdad Railway, roughly along the 37th parallel between the 37th and 42nd eastern meridians. In the west, it almost surrounds the Turkish Hatay Province, partly following the course of the Orontes River and reaching the Mediterranean coast at the foot of Jebel Aqra.

Description

Since Turkey's 1939 appropriation of the Hatay State, the Syrian–Turkish border now touches the Mediterranean coast at Ras al-Bassit, south of Mount Aqra. Hatay province borders the Syrian Latakia and Idlib governorates.

With the exception of Hatay province, the Turkish side of the border is entirely within the Southeastern Anatolia Region. East of Meidan Ekbis, the border stretches eastward for some 400 km, roughly following the 37th parallel north and passing the 37th to 42nd meridians. From Al-Rai to Nusaybin/Qamishli, the border follows the tracks of the Konya-Baghdad Railway. It crosses the Euphrates River at Jarabulus/Karkamış and passes north of the border town of Kobanî (Ayn al Arab) (built in 1912 as part of the Baghdad Railway construction project). The Raqqa Governorate's Tell Abyad District borders the Turkish Şanlıurfa Province, including the divided border town of Tell Abyad/Akçakale. The Al-Hasakah Governorate, still bordering  Şanlıurfa Province, has a border crossing at Ras al-Ayn, connecting to Ceylanpınar. Some 100 km east of Ceylanpınar, the border passes the border town of Nusaybin in the Turkish Mardin Province (ancient Nisibis, the birthplace of Ephraim the Syrian), next to Syrian Qamishli.

On the Turkish side, the European route E90 runs alongside the length of the border, crossing the Euphrates at Birecik and the Tigris at Cizre.

History

At the start of the 20th century the entire border region was part of the Ottoman Empire. During the First World War, an Arab Revolt (supported by the British) successfully ousted the Ottomans from Syria and Mesopotamia, however Britain and France had secretly agreed to partition the area between them in 1916 via the Sykes–Picot Agreement.

In 1920 Syria formally became a French mandatory territory, being initially split into a number of states, including the French-controlled Sanjak of Alexandretta (modern Hatay province). By the 1920 Treaty of Sèvres Anatolian Turkey was to be partitioned, with the Syrian-Turkish frontier placed further north than its current position. Turkish nationalists were outraged at the treaty, contributing to the outbreak the Turkish War of Independence; the Turkish success in this conflict rendered Sèvres obsolete. A new border more favourable to Turkey was drawn by the Franco-Turkish Treaty of Ankara in 1921 after negotiations between French Prime Minister Aristide Briand and Turkish Foreign Minister Yusuf Kemal Bey. By the 1923 Treaty of Lausanne Turkey's independence was recognised and a far more generous territorial settlement was agreed upon, albeit at the cost of Turkey formally renouncing any claim to Arab lands. Following Lausanne, the Syrian-Turkish frontier was delimited more precisely between Meidan Ekbis and Nusaybin in 1926, and between Nusaybin and the tripoint with Iraq in 1929. A Final Delimitation Protocol covering the entire boundary east of Hatay was then confirmed and deposited with the League of Nations on 3 May 1930.

A special case was what is now Turkey's Hatay province, which remained autonomous until 1923, then became part of Syria as the Sanjak of Alexandretta, briefly became independent as the Hatay State in 1938, before being annexed by Turkey as Hatay Province in 1939. The Hatay section of the boundary was delimited in 1938 and then confirmed the following year, being marked on the ground by numerous pillars. Hatay was then formally transferred to Turkey on 23 July 1939.

Syria gained independence in 1944, and the frontier then became one between two sovereign states; when Turkey joined NATO (1952) and the OSCE (1973), its boundary with Syria also then formed an outer border of these organisations. Syria continued to claim Hatay province as part of Greater Syria, often depicting the region as part of Syria on official maps, though in recent decades their claims have been less pronounced.

Since the Syrian Civil War broke out in 2011, tensions across the border have increased, and there have been a number of clashes; there has also been a substantial influx of refugees across the border to Turkey. Turkey began construction of a border barrier in 2014.

According to the Syrian Observatory for Human Rights, around 471 Syrians civilians, including 86 children and 45 women, have been killed by the Turkish gendarmerie at the Syrian–Turkish border since the beginning of the Syrian civil war.

Border crossings 
From west to east, as of 28 December 2022.

Gallery

See also
Syria–Turkey barrier
Syria–Turkey relations
Syrian–Turkish border clashes during the Syrian Civil War
Northern Syria Buffer Zone
Syrian Turkmen
Kurdistan
Refugees of the Syrian Civil War

References

 
1961 establishments in Syria
1961 establishments in Turkey
1961 in international relations
International borders